Andreas Hofmann (born 13 April 1986) is a retired German footballer who played as a midfielder.

In his youth, Hofmann played for local club Bettringen and later for the football club of Schwäbisch Gmünd, before he joined VfR Aalen.

References

1986 births
Living people
German footballers
Association football midfielders
2. Bundesliga players
3. Liga players
1. FC Normannia Gmünd players
VfR Aalen players
SpVgg Greuther Fürth players
Karlsruher SC players
People from Schwäbisch Gmünd
Sportspeople from Stuttgart (region)
Footballers from Baden-Württemberg